Xiphinema vuittenezi is a plant pathogenic nematode infecting apple and pear.

See also 
 List of apple diseases
 List of pear diseases

References

External links 
 Nemaplex, University of California - Xiphinema vuittenezi

Agricultural pest nematodes
Apple tree diseases
Pear tree diseases
Longidoridae